The 2 arrondissements of the Creuse department are:
 Arrondissement of Aubusson, (subprefecture: Aubusson) with 129 communes. The population of the arrondissement was 44,680 in 2016.  
 Arrondissement of Guéret, (prefecture of the Creuse department: Guéret) with 127 communes. The population of the arrondissement was 74,822 in 2016.

History

In 1800 the arrondissements of Guéret, Aubusson, Bourganeuf and Boussac were established. The arrondissements of Bourganeuf and Boussac were disbanded in 1926. 

The borders of the arrondissements of Creuse were modified in March 2017:
 18 communes from the arrondissement of Aubusson to the arrondissement of Guéret
 28 communes from the arrondissement of Guéret to the arrondissement of Aubusson

References

 
Creuse